Fedir Avramovych Zharko (4(17)/VI/1914-17/VII/1986), Merited Artist of Ukraine (1965).

Fedir Zharko was one of the most renowned singers of dumy (sung epic poems) in Ukraine. He was born in 1914 in village of Mykhailivka, Cherkasy province. From 1931 to 1936 Zharko studied at the Cherkasy Pedagogical Institute, completing his studies in Mathematics and Physics. Here he also became acquainted with the bandurist Vusatyj from the city of Chyhyryn, who inspired him to learn to play the bandura. From 1936 to 1940 up until World War II he worked as a village school teacher in Kiev Oblast (province).

Initially he learned to play the bandura from Fedir Hlushko. After World War II he spent six years incarcerated in Irkutsk and Kolyma for being a village elder during the German occupation of Ukraine.

In 1945, after singing at a concert he was invited to join the Dumka chorus in Kiev. In 1948 he became a member of the Kiev Bandurist Capella where he spent some 25 years performing with the group until his retirement in 1974.

Repertoire
From 1958 he recorded a large number of dumy and historic songs for the Melodia company, and published a number of collections of songs and dumy.(1967, 1969)

His repertoire included the following dumy (ten authentic and four contemporary dumy):

 The Duma about the death of the Kozak Bandurist (Hlushko) 
 The Samara Brothers (Hlushko) 
 Captives lament (Hlushko) 
 Storm on the Black Sea - 
 The Oziv Brothers - 
 Kozak Holota - 
 Fedir the one without kin 
 Marusia Bohuslavka 
 About the sister and brother 
 About the poor widow and her three sons

Contemporary dumy-songs

 About Lenin 
 It is not the Wind 
 Blood is not water 
 Freedom is coming

Zharko has also been the author of a number of songs and dumy.

Publications

Ukrains'ki narodni pisni dlia holosu v suprovodi bandury

Yuni spivaky-bandurysty

Sources

Omelchenko, A. F. - Banduryst Fedir Zharko // NTE, 1975 #3
Omel'chenko, A. F. - Poklykannia // Muzyka, 1979 #2, p. 24
Nemyrovych, I. - Vziav by ia banduru - Kiev, 1986

Kobzarstvo
Bandurists
20th-century Ukrainian male singers
Recipients of the title of Merited Artist of Ukraine
1986 deaths
1914 births
Soviet male singers